Jamie Whincup (born 6 February 1983) is an Australian professional racing driver competing in the Supercars Championship. He currently is team principal for Triple Eight Race Engineering. He has driven the No. 88 Holden ZB Commodore, won a record seven Supercars championship titles, four Bathurst 1000 victories, and a Bathurst 12 Hour victory. Whincup is the all-time record holder in the Supercars Championship for race wins, at 124 career wins. He is also the first driver to win the Jason Richards Memorial Trophy twice at Pukekohe Park Raceway in Auckland, New Zealand.

Early life
Whincup was born in Melbourne, Australia to Sandra and David Whincup. He attended Eltham College in Research, Victoria. Whincup once lived with fellow driver Will Davison.

Junior racing career
In 2001 Whincup embarked on the Australian Formula Ford Championship with a team run by his father and Uncle Graeme (a former Sports Sedan star) with mechanical support from fellow V8 Supercar driver Greg Ritter, racing with the Mygale Formula Ford team. After finishing third in his debut year, he moved to Sonic Motorsport(owner Michael Ritter, Brother of Greg Ritter ) for the 2002 season and went on to win the championship convincingly,  which secured him his first ever V8 Supercar drive with Garry Rogers Motorsport.

Professional career

Garry Rogers Motorsport

2002
Whincup made his Supercars debut in 2002 as an endurance co-driver for Garry Rogers Motorsport. His first event was at the 2002 Queensland 500 driving a Holden VX Commodore with Max Dumesny. He made his Bathurst 1000 debut at the next round, driving with Mark Noske. Whincup and Noske completed 72 laps before retiring from the race following a collision.

2003
Whincup continued with Garry Rogers Motorsport in 2003 and completed his first full time V8 Supercars season.

Tasman Motorsport
Whincup landed himself a full-time drive in 2005 with the Melbourne-based Tasman Motorsport. He had many solid results throughout the season, including a fourth at the one-off Chinese round at the Shanghai International Circuit, a third at the Sandown 500 and most notably, second at the Bathurst 1000 endurance events with teammate Jason Richards after leading late in the race.

Triple Eight Race Engineering

2006

In 2006, Whincup jumped from Holden to Ford and joined Triple Eight Race Engineering alongside Craig Lowndes. Whincup had a stellar first season, taking victory in the two biggest races of the season, the Clipsal 500 and Supercheap Auto 1000, the latter as co-driver to Craig Lowndes. After some incidents and unreliability, Whincup finished the championship in a slightly disappointing tenth position at years end.

2007
In 2007, Whincup returned with the same team which was re-branded TeamVodafone and celebrated several victories included a second Bathurst 1000 title alongside teammate Craig Lowndes and new engineer Mark Dutton. Whincup finished second in the driver's title by a mere two points to Garth Tander from the HSV Dealer Team. Whincup began a mentoring role as part of TeamVodafone's Junior Development Program, and as a co-ambassador for Formula Ford Australia alongside Will Davison. His first round win for 2007, at a water-logged Winton, was the first round win for the year by a Ford driver. He celebrated both his 50th V8 Supercar Championship start and his inaugural pole position at Triple Eight Race Engineering's test track, Queensland Raceway. Whincup moved into the championship lead after a successful defence his and Lowndes' Bathurst 1000 crown, coming just weeks after teaming with Lowndes to win the last Sandown 500 until 2012. Entering Surfers Paradise for the Indy 300 with the series lead from Garth Tander, a difficult day on Sunday with a spin in the final race saw the lead revert to Tander who won the round. Whincup then had a disappointing weekend at Desert 400 at the Bahrain International Circuit, where poor qualifying pace for Triple Eight was compounded by a run of all three races marred by minor accidents, and he took away zero points. Tander and Craig Lowndes both had fairly good weekends, putting Tander into the series lead over Lowndes heading into the Symmons Plains race in Tasmania. Tander backed up his previous two round wins in Tasmania with a dominant race 1 win on Saturday, but a slow stop in race two dropped him to tenth, before disaster in race three after touching Steven Richards, he broke his steering and was out. Whincup won both races, and headed into the Grand Finale at Phillip Island on the 1–2 December weekend with a slender seven point championship lead. Whincup failed to keep his slender margin at Phillip Island; after Garth Tander won the first two races Whincup faced a seven-point deficit. After the final race Whincup finished second, behind Todd Kelly and two places ahead of Tander but fell just two points short of the title. At the 2007 V8 Supercar Gala Awards Dinner at the completion of the 2007 season, Whincup was awarded the Barry Sheene Medal, deemed to be the "Best and Fairest" award for V8 Supercars.

2008
Whincup won the 2008 Clipsal 500 in Adelaide, and won a further six rounds after that including the Bathurst 1000 for a third year running. During a post race interview at Symmons Plains, Whincup spun the car into a ditch whilst attempting to perform something special. He clinched his first Championship after winning the first race in the final round at Oran Park Raceway, and was awarded the Barry Sheene Medal for the second year running at the V8 Gala Awards.

2009
In 2009, Whincup successfully defended his title in a brand new Ford FG Falcon, including wins at Adelaide, Hamilton, Tasmania, Darwin, Townsville, Oueensland, Phillip Island and Barbagallo. Despite bad luck in the endurance races and at the Gold Coast, Whincup was able to put it all together at Sydney Olympic Park and became the first back-to-back championship winner since Marcos Ambrose in 2003–2004.

2010

In 2010, Triple Eight switched to Holden VE Commodores as Ford cut sponsorship. Whincup won the first four races of the season and Hamilton but a run of bad luck at Queensland raceway and Winton saw him relinquish the championship lead for the first time in two years, and sat second in the points table, just ahead of teammate Craig Lowndes in third. He became close to becoming a 3-time champion, the next triple champion in a row after Mark Skaife from 2000 to 2002 and the second man to win the driver's championship in both a Ford and a Holden after Norm Beechey, but due to a multi car crash in the 25th race of the season at the Sydney Telstra 500 in wet weather his car was badly damaged and couldn't continue. In the 26th and final race of the season he was out of reach to score enough points to take back the lead from James Courtney and finished 2nd in the season.

2011
In 2011, Whincup regained the championship from James Courtney becoming the first International V8 Supercars Champion. Whincup won races in Abu Dhabi, Adelaide, Perth, Winton, Townsville, Gold Coast, Tasmania and Sandown. The title that went down to the final race in Sydney where Whincup beat teammate Craig Lowndes by 35 points. Triple Eight Race Engineering's stellar season earned them 1st in the Teams Championship, their second Teams Championship with Holden.

2012
The 2012 season saw Whincup join Bob Jane, Allan Moffat and Jim Richards as a four-time series champion. Twelve race wins at Adelaide, Symmons Plains, Hidden Valley, Townsville, Sydney Motorsport Park, Abu Dhabi and Winton, and also the marquee endurance races, the Bathurst 1000 and the Gold Coast 600 resulted in a 339-point championship win over his teammate Lowndes.

2013

The 2012 season was the last of the Holden/Ford duopoly in V8 Supercars, as 2013 would see a new challenge arise in the form of two extra manufacturers - Nissan and Mercedes-Benz. Whincup would stay with Triple Eight Race Engineering and Holden, but with a new look - Red Bull replaced Vodafone as major sponsor, with the team to be known as Red Bull Racing Australia.

Despite the new era increasing outright competitiveness across the field and the season having 13 separate race winners, Whincup once again proved dominant. He won 11 out of the 34 races, winning at New Zealand, Barbagallo, Hidden Valley, Ipswich, Sandown, Phillip Island and Homebush. He was also victorious in the series' first outing to the US at the Circuit of the Americas, taking victory on three of four occasions. He went on to once again eclipse Lowndes in the points table, and earn himself a fifth title, putting himself alongside Ian Geoghegan, Dick Johnson and Mark Skaife in terms of championship successes.

2014

In 2014, Whincup would win a record sixth title. Once again partnering with Paul Dumbrell, he narrowly missed out on the Bathurst 1000 title for the second year running. After a final lap battles with Mark Winterbottom in 2013, this time he lost out to Ford Performance Racing teammate Chaz Mostert as he ran low on fuel. He did, however, win the Enduro Cup with Dumbrell as the most successful driver combination across the endurance events.

2015

During 2015 at Bathurst, Whincup had led the race mid-way through, only to wind up behind team-mate Lowndes thanks to a throttle sensor problem that required a long stop. He was still behind Lowndes when the crucial Safety Car period arrived in Lap 138, and decided to stay out for an extra lap rather than stack behind Lowndes in pit-lane despite being asked to pit by the Red Bull team. It was during that lap he made an illegal pass on the Safety Car, a pass that earned him a drive-through penalty and ruined any chance of taking a decent result away from Mount Panorama. After the race, Whincup has accepted full responsibility after a late race penalty for passing the Safety Car cost him a shot at a fifth Bathurst 1000 victory. Whincup misread a call which ultimately saw him illegally pass the Safety Car going up Mountain Straight as the critical final pitstops were unfolding.
Whincup finished fifth in the championship 599-points adrift to long-time rival Winterbottom after a difficult season.

2016

In 2016, Whincup became the second driver in Supercars/ATCC history to win 100 races, the other being Triple Eight teammate Lowndes at the Sydney Motorsport Park. Triple Eight's strategy of making early first stops with all three of its cars paid dividends as the team stormed to its seventh straight victory. At the Bathurst 1000, Whincup would fail to win despite being the first to cross the finish line, due to a time penalty following a collision with Scott McLaughlin and Garth Tander. This penalty was later appealed by Triple Eight Race Engineering but dismissed the case was dismissed nine days after the race.

2017

2017 saw Triple Eight become the official Holden factory squad under the banner Red Bull Holden Racing Team. Whincup and Triple Eight were in the shadow of Dick Johnson Racing Team Penske being out qualified and outraced by their drivers Scott McLaughlin and Fabian Coulthard. Whincup however proved, despite a lack of poles and wins by his standards, that consistency was key to his eventual championship win which he recorded in the final race in Newcastle after McLaughlin had received 3 penalties relegating him behind the 11th position he needed to win the championship. Whincup not only won his record seventh title but also the final race win for the Australian built Commodore.

2018

In 2018, Whincup was one of 14 drivers in the field driving the Holden ZB Commodore. During the opening day of the Adelaide 500, Whincup overshadowed a thrilling qualifying session and slid wide through the high-speed sweeper on his final qualifying lap, slamming the outside concrete wall. His teammate Shane van Gisbergen claimed provisional 2 poles and won 2 races. But Whincup finished 6th in race 1 and failing a transmission failure ended up 26th in race 2.  At the Melbourne Grand Prix Circuit, Whincup start on 2nd and finished 2nd in race 3. He takes the polesitter and claimed in race 4 opened his victory. Whincup finish 2nd in race 5 and 3rd in race 6, he took the inaugural Larry Perkins Trophy for being the highest points-scorer across the weekend, but was left disappointed by his start in the finale. After poor performances at Phillip Island, Barbagallo and Winton, Whincup finished 3rd at Hidden Valley. Whincup marked the 10th running of the Townsville Street Circuit by taking his 10th race win in commanding fashion. Whincup took the lead from McLaughlin on lap two and controlled proceedings for the balance of the 70 laps, leading by more than 10 seconds for the bulk of it. At Tailem Bend during the event, Whincup won the race 23 of The Bend Motorsport Park ahead of van Gisbergen, with David Reynolds third. On 16 September, Whincup and a co-driver Dumbrell led from start to finish and sweep of the Sandown 500 podium for a dominant Triple Eight Holden squad, as Enduro Cup kicked off. On 7 October 2018 at Bathurst, Dumbrell lost the right front wheel before hurtling down pit straight as the field went left at Hell Corner. Whincup finished 10th and he curse continued on Sunday when the V8 immortal suffered another 1000 km fail.

2019

Whincup take his first win at the Ipswich SuperSprint drought by taking the win in an action-packed opening race at Queensland Raceway after the toughest weekends he's had with Triple Eight. On Race 24 at Pukekohe, Whincup was incorrectly picked up by the Safety Car despite being further back in the field due to having already taken his first compulsory pit stop, which prompted him to pass it without permission. Whincup took the chequered flag in 16th position and having dropped back to 20th immediately after serving his punishment. In November 2019, Whincup inherited the lead and won the race with Craig Lowndes, a repeat of their 2007 win together and their fifth and sixth wins of the race respectively, as Scott McLaughlin wrapped up successive championships. He won 5 race wins and claims 3rd in championship standings.

2020
In 2020 season, the General Motors announced that the Holden brand will be retired by 2021. On 22 February, Jamie Whincup won the first race in Superloop Adelaide 500 and become the 119th career race win was his 86th in a Holden, moving one ahead of former Triple Eight teammate turned co-driver Craig Lowndes on the all-time tally. At the final round of the Bathurst 1000, Whincup battling with Brodie Kostecki and Chaz Mostert when he ran wide at The Cutting and hit the wall on Lap 33. Lowndes, who'd just hopped out of the #888 entry, was philosophical about the crash. It's the first time since 2002 that Whincup and Lowndes have suffered a DNF and claims 4 wins and 4th in the Championship due the COVID-19 pandemic.

GT Racing

On 5 February 2017, Whincup drove in and won his first ever GT race when he teamed with Lowndes and Finnish driver Toni Vilander to win the 2017 Liqui Moly Bathurst 12 Hour driving a Ferrari 488 GT3 for Maranello Motorsport. By winning the Bathurst 12 Hour, Whincup joined Triple Eight teammate Craig Lowndes and as well as Gregg Hansford, Allan Grice, Tony Longhurst, John Bowe, Dick Johnson, Paul Morris and Jonathon Webb as winners of both the Bathurst 1000 and Bathurst 12 Hour races.

Business career
In 2016, Whincup opened Loca Cafe, a café and car wash business, in Hope Island, Queensland.

In 2018, Whincup took a 15% ownership stake in Triple Eight Race Engineering.

Personal life
Whincup lives in Hope Island in Queensland near his Loca Cafe business venture. Whincup appeared on season 1 of the reality television program Australia's Greatest Athlete in 2009.

Career results

Supercars Championship results
(Races in bold indicate pole position) (Races in italics indicate fastest lap)

Bathurst 1000 results

Complete Bathurst 12 Hour results

References

External links

 
 
 The MySpace of Jamie Whincup
 Jamie Whincup - Profile on Racing Reference

1983 births
Living people
Racing drivers from Melbourne
Formula Ford drivers
Supercars Championship drivers
Bathurst 1000 winners
Australian Endurance Championship drivers
Garry Rogers Motorsport drivers
Mercedes-AMG Motorsport drivers